The Americas Zone was one of three zones of regional competition in the 2017 Fed Cup.

Group I 
 Venue: Club Deportivo la Asunción, Metepec, Mexico (outdoor hard)
 Date: 6–11 February

The nine teams were divided into two pools of four and five teams. The two pool winners took part in a play-off to determine the nation advancing to the World Group II play-offs. The four nations finishing last and second last in their pools took part in relegation play-offs, with the two losing nations being relegated to Group II for 2018.

Seeding: The seeding was based on the Fed Cup Rankings of 14 November 2016 (shown in parentheses below).

Pools

Play-offs

Final placements 

  was promoted to the 2017 Fed Cup World Group II play-offs.

Group II 
 Venue: Centro de Alto Rendimiento Fred Maduro, Panama City, Panama (outdoor clay)
 Date: 19–22 July

The thirteen teams were divided into three pools of three teams and one pool of four teams. The four pool winners took part in a play-off to determine the two nations advancing to Group I in 2018.

Seeding: The seeding was based on the Fed Cup Rankings of 24 April 2017 (shown in parentheses below).

Pools

Play-offs

Final placements 

  and  advanced to Americas Zone Group I in 2018.

References 

 Fed Cup Result, 2017 Americas Group I
 Fed Cup Result, 2017 Americas Group II

External links 
 Fed Cup website

 
Americas
Tennis tournaments in Mexico
Tennis tournaments in Panama
2017 in Mexican tennis
2017 in Panamanian sport